The Yugoslav Cup, officially known between 1923 and 1940 as the King Alexander Cup (and between 1947 and 1991 as the Marshal Tito Cup, was one of two major football competitions in Yugoslavia, the other one being the Yugoslav League Championship. The Yugoslav Cup took place after the league championships when every competitive league in Yugoslavia had finished, in order to determine which teams are ranked as their corresponding seeds. The Marshal Tito Cup trophy was based on a design by Branko Šotra.

Kingdom of Yugoslavia (1923–1940)
The pre-WW II competition in the then Kingdom of Slovenes, Croats and Serbs (renamed Kingdom of Yugoslavia at the end of 1929) was held irregularly, and sometimes involved only regional selections, sometimes only clubs, and occasionally both clubs and regions.  Between 1924 and 1927 the competition consisted of squads from the regional subassociations. Only the players with citizenship of the Kingdom of Serbs, Croats and Slovenes were eligible.

List of winners

 1940 Građanski Zagreb title is unverifiable

The winners of the 1928 and 1930 editions are unknown. Split XI, losing finalists in 1924 and 1925, was composed of Hajduk Split players only. After their third successive win in 1926, Zagreb obtained the golden cup of King Aleksandar to keep.

SFR Yugoslavia (1947–92)

Competition format
The competition format was an elimination championship where every competitive team was offered a chance to enter. Beginning in the lowest tiers of teams, the competition followed a one-game elimination format. Higher-tier teams got berths in the second round, third round, and so on. The First League (Prva Liga) teams always began in the 1/16 finals, and the rest of the 16 berths being filled by lower-tier teams who managed to make it to the round of 32.

Once the round of 16 was reached, the format would be changed to a two-game elimination format, being played at home and away for each team. At this point it became a First League ordeal, as the smaller teams had zero chance against the titans of Yugoslavian football. Historically, the finals were usually reached only by the better-performing First League teams (Partizan, Hajduk, Red Star, Dinamo, etc.).

Key

List of winners

 No participation of Croatian and Slovenian clubs. The only Macedonian club dropped out of competition in Round of 16. The last Bosnian club left the competition in May 1992 in Semi finals stage.

Results by team
Teams shown in italics are no longer in existence.

Performance by Republic/Province

Successor cups
  → Bosnia and Herzegovina Football Cup (1994–present)
  → Croatian Football Cup (1992–present)
  → Kosovar Cup (1991–present)
  → Macedonian Football Cup (1992–present)
  → Montenegrin Cup (2006–present; from 1992 to 2006 had a joint cup with Serbia)
  → Serbian Cup (2006–present, from 1992 to 2006 had a joint cup with Montenegro)
  → Slovenian Football Cup (1991–present)

See also
Serbia and Montenegro Cup
Yugoslav First League
Football Association of Yugoslavia

References

External links
 Yugoslavia/Serbia and Montenegro Cup finals at RSSSF

 
Cup
Recurring sporting events established in 1923
Recurring sporting events established in 1947
1923 establishments in Yugoslavia
1947 establishments in Yugoslavia
Recurring events disestablished in 1991